Harewood is one of several houses in the vicinity of Charles Town, West Virginia built for members of the Washington family.

Description
The house was designed by John Ariss for Samuel Washington in 1770, using a center-hall, single-pile plan. The two-story limestone house has a raised basement and flanking stone wings. Exterior details are simple, with only a modillioned cornice at the eaves of the shallow hipped roof. The interior is detailed in the manner of the Tidewater-region houses that Washington and Arris were familiar with. Interior detailing is extensive with Doric pilasters in the main downstairs rooms.

History
Samuel Washington moved to Harewood from his farm on Chotank Creek in Stafford County, Virginia to Harewood, accumulating  by the time he died in 1781

George Washington visited the house several times. James Madison and Dolley Payne Todd were married at Harewood on September 15, 1794. Dolley's sister was Lucy Washington, wife of Samuel Washington's son, George Steptoe Washington, who had inherited the estate.

The property remains in the Washington family.

See also
Blakeley (West Virginia)
Cedar Lawn
Claymont Court
Happy Retreat

References

External links

Colonial architecture in West Virginia
Farms on the National Register of Historic Places in West Virginia
Georgian architecture in West Virginia
Historic American Buildings Survey in West Virginia
Houses in Jefferson County, West Virginia
Houses on the National Register of Historic Places in West Virginia
John Ariss buildings
National Register of Historic Places in Jefferson County, West Virginia
Plantation houses in West Virginia
Stone houses in West Virginia
Washington family residences
Houses completed in 1770